Maués is a municipality located in the Brazilian state of Amazonas. Its population was 65,040 (2020) and its area is 39,988 km2.

Geography
Maués is known as the "Land of Guaraná". There are sandy beaches, and Maues summer festival and Guarana festival. The Mundurucus and Maues Indians cultivated the guarana fruit, which is the basis for the famous Brazilian soft drink.
Maués means "talking parrots" and it is originated from one of the Indian clans in the region. Maués has 22.000 inhabitants with another 20.000 natives spread along 140 river villages. The area's 20.000 people are distributed within 140 villages spread along the rivers. Maués is located on the side of Maués-Açu river and can be reached from Manaus (267 km away) by regional boat (18 hours), fast boat (7 hours) or plane (45 min.).
Maués is used as a starting point for adventure trekking including visit to the Amana waterfall, old goldmines, caves, exploration of primary jungle with Indian guides and visit to the Uraira developing reserve.

Maués Airport serves the region.

Conservation

The municipality contains all or part of the Alto Maués Ecological Station,  Amazônia National Park, Juruena National Park, Pau-Rosa National Forest, Maués State Forest and Andirá Marau Indigenous Territory. It is thought that the area has high gold mining potential.
The municipality contains the  Urupadi National Forest, a sustainable use conservation unit created in 2016.
It includes the  Urariá Sustainable Development Reserve, created in 2001.

Cultivation of guaraná
One of the things Maués is known for is guaraná, and every year they celebrate this with the Guaraná festival. The festival typically includes live music, especially the local pagode dance which will involve the whole city in the festivities. The guarana fruit is used in the traditional Brazilian soft drink, sold in several varieties in Brazil. These soft drinks are now also exported to outside countries, and the guaraná is becoming a known ingredient in drinks for boosting energy.

Notable people
 

Homero de Miranda Leão (1913–1987), poet, teacher and politician

References

Municipalities in Amazonas (Brazilian state)